Jason Belmonte  (born 29 July 1983) is an Australian professional ten-pin bowler. He plays on the PBA Tour in the United States and in world events. He is known for being one of the first bowlers to gain media attention for using the two-handed approach style to deliver his shot. He has won 31 PBA titles (seventh most all-time), including a record 15 major championships; he is only one of eight bowlers in PBA tour history to achieve 30 wins, making him the only 30-time winner in PBA Tour history who is not currently a member of the PBA Hall of Fame (he has yet to meet the 20 years on Tour requirement). He is one of two bowlers in PBA history to have won the Super Slam, winning all five PBA major titles (the other being Mike Aulby). He has been named PBA Player of the Year seven times, tying the record previously set by Walter Ray Williams Jr. Belmonte accumulated $1 million (USD) in career PBA earnings faster than any player in history (131 tournaments), surpassed the $1.5 million mark PBA earnings during the 2019 season, and eclipsed $2 million in PBA earnings during the 2022 season. Belmonte has 25 career 300 games in PBA Tour events through 2020, including the PBA's 21st nationally televised 300 in 2012, as well as the 34th nationally televised 300 over ten years later in 2022. His accolades have him ranked on several lists as one of the greatest bowlers of all time, if not the greatest.

Belmonte is perhaps the most well-marketed bowler of all time, owing in part to his popularization of two-handed bowling. He is a member of the Storm, 3G Shoes and Vise Grips pro staffs. Storm has collaborated with Belmonte to develop the "Trend" line of bowling balls, which bear the Belmo nickname and silhouette logo.

He was appointed a Member of the Order of Australia (AM) in the 2022 Queen's Birthday Honours for significant service to tenpin bowling at the elite level.

Early life 

Jason Belmonte was born on 29 July 1983 in Orange, New South Wales, Australia. His father Aldo opened the Orange Ten Pin Bowl when Jason was a toddler. As a result, Jason started rolling a ball at 18 months old. Interviewed in 2009, he commented: "The only problem for me though was as an 18-month-old baby boy lifting a nine- to 10-pound (4–4.5 kg) bowling ball ... it was a little hard, so like all babies I pushed the ball with two hands." In doing so he developed a two-handed style which he uses today, placing only two fingers and no thumb in the ball to produce more revolutions.

Titles 

Belmonte has won one European Bowling Tour title, the Brunswick Euro Challenge, held in Greece. He also won the World Tenpin Masters championship in 2007. In September 2010, he defeated American Sean Rash in the finals to earn the 2010 Korea Cup title.

On the PBA Tour, Belmonte owns 30 titles (7th on the PBA's all-time list), including his first title at the Bowling Foundation Long Island Classic (2009), and three titles in the 2011–12 season (GEICO Shark Open, World Series of Bowling Chameleon Open, and the Pepsi PBA Elite Players Championship). After making the televised finals in five of six PBA majors without winning, he defeated Wes Malott to capture his first PBA major title: the 2012–13 USBC Masters. (Belmonte would be retroactively awarded a major title for the 2011 Elite Players Championship, making the USBC Masters his second major.) He captured his third major at the 2014 Barbasol Tournament of Champions, again defeating Malott in the title match. On 8 February 2015, Belmonte became the first bowler to win three consecutive USBC Masters tournaments after defeating No. 1 seeded AJ Johnson. On 15 February 2015, he defeated No. 1 seed Rhino Page to capture his second consecutive Barbasol Tournament of Champions title, and his second major title in two weeks. After winning three major titles in 2017, including an unprecedented fourth USBC Masters, Belmonte stood in second place on the all-time PBA majors list with nine, behind only Earl Anthony and Pete Weber, who both have ten. He won the first major of 2019, the PBA Tournament of Champions, to tie the record with ten majors. One month later, Belmonte won the 2019 PBA World Championship, making him the all-time major titles leader. In February 2020, Belmonte won the U.S. Open to claim the "super slam" (a title in all five PBA majors), the second in PBA history after Mike Aulby.

Bowling career

Amateur and international accomplishments

Aged seventeen, Belmonte became the first Junior Australian to bowl a 300 game overseas. He also took five gold medals at the 2000 Junior National Championships, was selected for the Youth Australia team, and also held a place in this team in 2002 and 2004. Belmonte was awarded the 2001 Orange Junior Sportsperson of the Year and won the 2002 Senior Award. He also was awarded the Orange Sportsperson of the Year award in both 2002 and 2003. Belmonte won one gold, one silver and two bronze medals at the 2002 Commonwealth Championships in Scotland.  Belmonte competed in Fédération Internationale des Quilleurs (FIQ) tournaments (the governing body of the sport and now known as International Bowling Federation (IBF)) such as the World Tenpin Bowling Association (WTBA) and Asian FIQ championships. He won a silver medal at the WTBA World Youth Championships in Thailand. Later in the year, he was selected in the Australian Open men's team, where he remains to the present time.

In 2004, Belmonte took three gold, one silver and one bronze the Asian Youth FIQ in Hong Kong and followed this up in the World Youth FIQ titles in Guam with a gold in the singles and a gold in all events.  He won the prestigious 2004 Bowler of the Year award, voted by the Board of Directors of the World Bowlers Writers' Association.

Belmonte was invited to participate in the 2005 World Tenpin Masters in England where he was defeated in the semi-finals. In this event, he made history by bowling the first-ever 300 game in the event. The game was filmed by Matchroom Sport. In 2007, Belmonte was once again invited to take part in the World Tenpin Masters, held at the Barnsley Metrodome. After defeating the defending champion Chris Barnes of the United States in the semi-finals, Belmonte went on to defeat England's Paul Moor in the finals where he rolled the event's second-ever 300 game. Belmonte rolled 23 out of a possible 24 strikes to win the event with a 566 score for two games, against Moor's 524.

Belmonte represented Australia in the 2006 World Youth Championships in Berlin. He was part of the team to take the gold medal in the Team Event and went on to make the Masters after finishing in sixth place in the All Events. He was defeated in the second step of the Masters by the eventual winner, Mads Sandbaekken from Norway. He also competed in the adult version on the same year at Men's World Championship at the Asiad Bowling Center in Busan, Korea and went on to make the Masters match-play after finishing 4th. He lost to eventual winner Biboy Rivera from Philippines to take the bronze medal.

Belmonte participated in the 2007 World Ranking Masters and after qualifying in second position, was defeated in the quarter finals by eventual runner-up Peter Ljung from Sweden, 2–0 (190–258, 158–279), finishing in sixth place.

In 2011, in the World Bowling Tour, Belmonte defeated good friend and PBA Player Mike Fagan, 511–505, to win the Thailand Open.

In 2022, Belmonte defeated Kyle Troup, 259-236, to win the 2022 Devil's Lair Tasmania.

AMF World Cup

Jason Belmonte competed in the 2004 AMF World Cup in Singapore and led all five days of qualifying events. He finished in fifth place after being knocked out in the quarter final.

Belmonte competed again in the 2007 AMF World Cup in St. Petersburg, Russia where he was also lead qualifier. He finished runner-up after he was defeated in the final by Bill Hoffman (USA). As a result, Belmonte won the country rankings for Australia with Ann-Maree Putney, who won the trophy in the women's world cup.

In his third appearance in the 2011 AMF World Cup in Johannesburg, South Africa he was crowned as AMF Bowling World Cup champion.
His first match was against Mykhaylo Kalika (Ukraine). Belmonte won the first game 237–203 and Kalika won the second game 248–266. Belmonte would win the deciding game 266–185.
Jason Belmonte then came up against first seed Tommy Jones (USA). Jones would win the first game 259–279 with Belmonte winning the second, 247–216. After Jones opened in the eighth frame, Belmonte defeated him in the third game 259–236 and became the first Australian man to take the title.
His three-game total of 765 was a new finals record, beating the previous mark of 764 by Petter Hansen (Norway), set in Singapore in 2004.

Belmonte stated "I was a long way in the lead in 2004 in Singapore, and got knocked in the quarters," he said, "and again I led the field in St Petersburg in 2007 and then I lost in the final. So I was happy to go in as number two seed this time".

PBA Tour

2008–09: Rookie of the Year
In 2009, Belmonte won the Bowling Foundation Long Island Classic PBA Tour event in his PBA TV finals debut. As the second seed, he defeated Bill O'Neill, and went on to defeat number one seed Mike Fagan 215–201 for his first PBA title.  The title earned Belmonte "exempt" status for the 2009–10 PBA Tour, and he was also named the 2008–09 PBA Rookie of the Year.

2009–10
2009–10 marked his first season as an exempt PBA bowler. Belmonte qualified for the TV finals in three events, but did not win a tournament.  He came close at the GEICO Mark Roth Plastic Ball Championship on 28 March 2010. Finishing as the top qualifier, he faced Brian Ziesig in the finals.  Ziesig was a non-exempt amateur who had to qualify via the TQR round. The two were tied at the end of the regulation game, 247–247, which sent the championship to a sudden-death, one-ball rolloff.  Belmonte's shot on his first attempt left a solid 7-pin standing.  Ziesig then threw a strike to take the title.

2010–11
In the 2010–11 season, Belmonte appeared in 10 of 12 PBA events, making match-play nine times and appearing on TV four times.  Without a victory, he had earnings of 62,950, while averaging 218.82 pins per game.  In his first three years on tour, Belmonte cashed in 33 of 37 tournaments, making match-play a total of 25 times, with eight  television appearance; and earnings of US$187,420.

2011–12: Return to victory
Belmonte won his second, third and fourth PBA titles at the PBA's "World Series of Bowling" in November 2011, taking the trophies in the Chameleon Open, GEICO Shark Open and the Pepsi PBA Elite Players Championship. Belmonte also rolled a nationally televised 300 game in the quarterfinals of the PBA World Championship, broadcast on 8 January 2012 in North America; however, he did not go on to win the tournament. Despite his three titles in the 2011–12 season, Belmonte did not win the PBA Player of the Year honors. The award was won by Sean Rash in an extremely close vote (Rash received 29% of the vote to Belmonte's 26.6%).

With his home crowd watching, Belmonte defeated Sean Rash in a best-of-three final (174–172, 223–255, 256–243) for his fifth PBA title at the 2012 Australian Masters in Sydney, Australia.

2012–13: Player of the Year
On 24 February 2013, Belmonte won his sixth PBA Tour title and first PBA major at the USBC Masters in North Brunswick, NJ. Belmonte finished with six consecutive strikes in the dramatic final match to top Wes Malott, 258–245. Belmonte won a second title on the 2012–13 season, his seventh overall, at the PBA Lucas Oil Bear Open in Wauwatosa, Wisconsin. He was runner-up to Wes Malott in the 2013 U.S. Open. It marked his seventh appearance in the TV finals of a major over the last eight major tournaments.

On 17 January 2014, Belmonte was named the Chris Schenkel PBA Player of the Year for the 2012–13 season. Along with two titles for the season, including a major title and runner-up finishes at three other major championships, Belmonte won the George Young High Average Award ( a PBA record 228.81) and the Harry Smith Points Leader Award (238,903). He became only the third PBA player born outside the USA (after Amleto Monacelli and Mika Koivuniemi) to win PBA Player of the Year.

2014: Major success, Player of the Year Repeat
Belmonte won the first tournament of the 2014 PBA season, the Barbasol Tournament of Champions in Allen Park, Michigan, which marked his second major tournament win and eighth title overall. As he did in his first major championship win, Belmonte defeated Wes Malott, this time in a 219–218 single game match. On 23 February 2014, he became the first player to repeat as USBC Masters champion in nearly 50 years, and also the first player in history to win a major as the 5th seed, defeating every rival in the championship stepladder final. (Billy Welu won back-to-back Masters in 1964–65.) This was Belmonte's ninth PBA title and third major. He captured his tenth title winning the Oklahoma Open during the PBA's Summer Swing.

His three titles (two majors) in the 2014 season made him an easy choice to win his second consecutive Chris Schenkel PBA Player of the Year award. In doing so, he became the first bowler to repeat as Player of the Year since Walter Ray Williams, Jr. won three consecutive awards from 1996 to 1998. Belmonte led all bowlers in season earnings ($163,788), average (226.71) and competition points (136,454).

2015: Player of the Year Three-Peat
Belmonte again won the USBC Masters on 8 February 2015, defeating amateur A.J. Johnson, a surprise #1 seed, in the final match, 202–157. In doing so, he joined Mike Aulby as the only three-time winners of this tournament, while becoming the only player to win the Masters in three consecutive seasons. On 15 February 2015, in Indianapolis, he captured his 12th PBA title by winning the Barbasol Tournament of Champions for the second consecutive season. As in the USBC Masters, Belmonte won from the #2 seed position, knocking off #4 seed Sean Rash in the semifinals, 235–203, before defeating top seed Rhino Page in the final match, 232–214. It was Belmonte's tenth appearance in the TV finals over the last 12 PBA major tournaments, and his fifth win in a major.

On 20 January 2016, Belmonte was named the Chris Schenkel PBA Player of the Year for 2015, the third consecutive season he won the award. In addition to his two major tournament wins, he had nine other Top Five finishes, led the PBA Tour in earnings ($178,542) and was fourth in average (225.4). He became the first non-American player to win three consecutive POY honors, and the fourth PBA player overall to do so (joining Earl Anthony, Mark Roth and Walter Ray Williams, Jr.).

2016
Belmonte made the five-player stepladder finals as the #3 seed for the 2016 PBA Fire Lake Tournament of Champions, seeking to join Jason Couch as the only players to win in this tournament in three consecutive seasons, but he was knocked off in the second match of the finals by Tom Daugherty. His bid for an unprecedented fourth USBC Masters title the following week also fell short, as he made the Round of 8 but was defeated by Wes Malott in the winner's bracket and Martin Larsen in the loser's bracket, keeping him out of the TV finals.

On 15 February 2016, Belmonte was retroactively awarded a major title for his 2011 PBA Elite Players Championship victory. After the tournament returned to major status in the 2016 season, the PBA voted to award additional major titles to the winners of the three previous Players Championship events (2011, 2013, 2015), stating the tournament "is a members-only event, and includes all of the elements of a major." This gave Belmonte six majors among his PBA Tour titles.

2017: Three Majors in One Year

On 12 February 2017, Belmonte won his 13th PBA title and seventh major in the PBA Players Championship held in Columbus, Ohio. Having qualified as the #1 seed, he defeated #2 seed Anthony Simonsen in his lone TV finals match. On 26 February, as the #1 seed again, he defeated Michael Tang to win his 14th PBA title, fourth USBC Masters title, and his eighth major title, becoming the only bowler to ever win four USBC Masters titles. As one of the top eight money leaders from the start of the 2015 season through the 2017 USBC Masters, Belmonte was invited to participate in the inaugural Main Event PBA Tour Finals in May 2017. Starting as the #1 seed, Jason finished runner-up to E. J. Tackett. Belmonte won his 15th PBA Tour title on 27 August 2017 at the PBA International-WBT Storm Lucky Larsen Masters, held in Malmö, Sweden. On 19 November, Belmonte won the PBA World Championship in Reno, NV for his 16th title and ninth career major. With the win, Belmonte became the first PBA player to ever win three major titles in a season.

Belmonte swept the three major PBA statistical categories for the 2017 season, including a PBA-record 229.39 average for 380 games. He also finished first in earnings ($238,912) and tied for first in wins (4). On 17 January, in a landslide vote, Belmonte won with his fourth PBA Player of the Year Award.

Also in 2017, Belmonte won the Dick Weber Bowling Ambassador Award, an honor given annually by the Bowling Proprietors Association of America (BPAA) to the "bowling athlete who has consistently shown grace on and off the lanes by promoting the sport of bowling in a positive manner."

2018
Belmonte collected his 17th PBA title on 25 February 2018, winning the Mark Roth/Marshall Holman PBA Doubles Championship with partner Bill O'Neill. He qualified as the #1 seed in the 2018 PBA Tour Finals, held 4–6 May in Allen Park, Michigan, and earned a rematch against last season's Finals champion, E. J. Tackett. Belmonte avenged his 2017 loss to Tackett for his 18th PBA Tour title.

2019: Making History, Player of the Decade
On 10 February 2019, Belmonte won his 19th PBA title and tenth major at the PBA Tournament of Champions held in Fairlawn, Ohio. As the #1 seed, he defeated E. J. Tackett 225–196 in the final match to claim the title. Belmonte's victory made him the third player to win three Tournament of Champions after Mike Durbin and Jason Couch, and tied him with Earl Anthony and Pete Weber as the all-time major titles leader (10 majors). Belmonte was also the top qualifier in the 2019 season's next two events – the PBA Players Championship and PBA Indianapolis Open – but he failed to win either event. At the Players Championship, a pair of 7-10 splits – once in the fourth frame and again in the tenth – cost him the match against Anthony Simonsen. At the Indianapolis Open, a few off-hits that refused to carry – once in the eighth frame and again in the tenth – handed the title to Norm Duke. He joined Johnny Petraglia, Earl Anthony, Walter Ray Williams Jr. and Jakob Butturff as the only players in history to qualify as the #1 seed in three consecutive PBA Tour events.

On 19 March 2019, Belmonte captured his 20th PBA title at the PBA Chameleon Championship, part of the 2019 World Series of Bowling in Allen Park, Michigan. He qualified as the #2 seed in the stepladder finals, defeating A.J. Chapman in the semifinal match, then Andres Gomez in the title match.

Two days later on 21 March, Belmonte won his 21st PBA title and record-breaking 11th major at the 2019 PBA World Championship, also part of the World Series of Bowling. Having earned the #1 seed for the stepladder finals, a record third consecutive major in which he was the top qualifier, he defeated Jakob Butturff 236–227 in the championship match to win the title. With his victory, Belmonte now stands alone as the all-time PBA and professional bowling leader in major titles, surpassing Earl Anthony and Pete Weber (who have 10 majors each).

Belmonte's streak of three consecutive majors in which he qualified as the top seed ended at the 2019 USBC Masters. He suffered a finger injury in a pre-tournament charity event, forcing him to alter his grip on the bowling ball, and finished well out of the top 64 that made match play.

Belmonte qualified as the #1 seed for the inaugural PBA Tour Playoffs held in Portland, Maine. He defeated Kyle Troup in the Round of 16 two games to one, but was then eliminated in the Round of 8 by Kris Prather, losing both matches.

On 28 April, Belmonte won the 2019 PBA DHC Japan Invitational held in Tokyo. Qualifying as the #3 seed for the stepladder finals, he defeated Chris Barnes, Takuya Miyazawa, and Jakob Butturff en route to his 22nd PBA Tour title, which tied him with Marshall Holman for 11th most career PBA Tour titles.

Belmonte surpassed $1.5 million (USD) in career PBA Tour earnings during the 2019 season, and led the Tour in titles (4), championship round appearances (12), average (225.62) and earnings (a career-high $288,290). By an overwhelming majority vote, Belmonte won his fifth Chris Schenkel PBA Player of the Year award in 2019.

On 3 January 2020, Bowlers Journal magazine named Belmonte the male Player of the Decade (2010–2019).

2020: Completing the Super Slam
On 23 February 2020, Belmonte won his 23rd PBA Tour title and 12th major at the U.S. Open in Lincoln, Nebraska. As the #2 seed for the stepladder finals, he defeated Dick Allen in the semifinal match and Anthony Simonsen in the championship match. With his victory, Belmonte became the second bowler in PBA history (after Mike Aulby) to complete the Super Slam (winning all five PBA majors), as well as becoming the seventh Triple Crown and third Grand Slam winner.

On 15 March, Belmonte won his 24th PBA Tour title and 13th major at the 2020 PBA World Championship, part of the PBA World Series of Bowling held in Las Vegas, Nevada. As the #1 seed for the finals, he defeated Anthony Simonsen in the championship match 213–190 to claim the win and the $150,000 top prize. This was Belmonte's third PBA World Championship title, winning all three consecutively and becoming the second bowler to do so (the other being Earl Anthony).

On 4 October, Belmonte won the PBA World Series of Bowling XI Chameleon Championship held in Centreville, Virginia (qualifying rounds were held in Las Vegas in March). As the #1 seed, he defeated Brad Miller in the championship match 232–202 to claim his third career (second consecutive) Chameleon Championship title and 25th career PBA Tour title, tying Brian Voss for 10th on the all-time titles list.

On 18 December 2020, Belmonte won the Chris Schenkel PBA Player of the Year Award for the sixth time. In addition to his three titles (two majors) on the season, Belmonte led the Tour in competition points, average (225.31) and earnings (a career-high $293,050).

2021
Despite not winning a title through the first nine events of the 2021 season, Belmonte accumulated enough points to earn a spot in the starting field for the PBA Tour Playoffs, qualifying 14th. However, Belmonte chose to skip the event and instead return home to Australia for the birth of his fourth child. He had also chosen to skip the PBA Tour Finals on 26–27 June, having qualified for that event as well.

2022: Five Titles in One Season
On 29 January, Belmonte captured his 26th PBA Tour title and 14th major at the 2022 PBA Players Championship, held in Euless, Texas.  He qualified as the #4 seed for the West Region finals and climbed the stepladder to defeat Jakob Butturff in the region championship match and advance to the championship finals. He qualified as the #2 seed for the finals in a three-game seeding round, then defeated Arturo Quintero in the semifinal match and Sean Rash in the championship match to claim his third PBA Players Championship title.

On 16 February, after winning the Kokomo Championship and his 27th career PBA title, Belmonte surpassed Don Johnson on the all-time titles list, having previously tied with him in ninth place.

On 15 March, Belmonte won the PBA World Series of Bowling XIII Scorpion Championship. As the #4 seed, he climbed the stepladder to claim his 28th career title. On the difficult Scorpion oil pattern, Belmonte rolled games of 247, 211, 242, and 244, while none of his opponents reached 200.

On 20 March, Belmonte won the Lubbock Sports Open for his fourth title of the 2022 season. Qualifying as the #3 seed for the stepladder finals, he defeated Jesper Svensson, Sean Lavery-Spahr, and E. J. Tackett en route to his 29th career PBA Tour title, tying Mike Aulby for 8th most in PBA history. Winning two out of four events in the Storm Cup series, Belmonte won a $10,000 (USD) bonus and the Storm Cup for finishing first in series points.

On 5 June, during the 2022 PBA Tour Finals, Belmonte threw the 34th televised 300 game in PBA Tour history. With Kyle Troup rolling a 300 game earlier in the telecast, it marked the first time in the Tour's 60-plus year history where a televised event featured more than one perfect game. Also, Belmonte joined Sean Rash, François Lavoie, and Chris Via as the fourth player to throw multiple televised 300 games in PBA Tour events. He would go on to sweep Dom Barrett 2-0 in the championship for his 30th career PBA Tour title, tying Dick Weber for 7th on the all-time titles list.

Belmonte led the 2022 PBA Tour in titles (a career-high five) and earnings ($302,525), while winning the Harry Smith PBA Points Leader award (34,230). Jason made nine championship round appearances and posted a 20–4 record in championship round matches. On November 4, the PBA announced that Belmonte had won his seventh Chris Schenkel PBA Player of the Year award, tying Walter Ray Williams Jr. for the most such awards in PBA history.

2023
On 19 March 2023, after failing to make the champions rounds of the first five tournaments, Belmonte climbed the stepladder as the #6 seed to win his 31st PBA title and fifteenth major at the PBA Tournament of Champions. With this victory, he became the first person in PBA history to win this event four times.

Professional wins

PBA Tour wins (31)

RO = After splitting the two-game final, Belmonte won in a 9th/10th frame roll-off.

+ = Belmonte won a $10,000 perfect game bonus.

Major championships

Wins (15)

Results timeline
Results not in chronological order.

1 – there were two PBA World Championships held in the 2012–2013 season.

"T" = Tied for a place"W" = West Region Finals

World Series of Bowling

Wins (5)

Results timeline
Results not in chronological order.

"T" = Tied for a place

PBA Tour career summary

* As of 13 June 2022

Personal life 
Belmonte is married to Kimberly Shapter, who is a registered nurse, and together they have four children: daughter Aria (b. December 2009), son Hugo (b. April 2012), daughter Sylvie (b. January 2016) and son Bowie (b. June 2021). The family resides in Orange, New South Wales.

References

External links 
 
 Official Jason Belmonte Bowling Jerseys & Apparel
 Industry profile of Jason Belmonte
 Jason Belmonte: The InterviewUnited States Bowling Congress, 10 November 2009.
 Jason Belmonte: player profileProfessional Bowlers Association

1983 births
Living people
People from Orange, New South Wales
Australian ten-pin bowling players
Members of the Order of Australia
Sportsmen from New South Wales